William Earl Becton, Jr. (born December 31, 1968) is an American gospel musician. He started his music career, in 1995, with the release of, Broken, that was released by Intersound Records. His second album, Heart of a Love Song, was released by CGI Records in association with A&M Records in 1997. The third release, B2k: Prophetic Songs of Promise, was released by CGI Records in 2000. He released his fourth album, Broken, Vol. 2: Live, with Tyscot Records in 2003. He got all of his album to chart on the Billboard magazine Gospel Albums chart.

Early life
Becton was born on December 31, 1968, in Washington, D.C., as William Earl Becton, Jr. He started singing at the age of four in his church choir called the intermediate youth choir, and he went to Sewell Music Conservatory to hone his singing acumen, when he was just eight years old. Becton is a graduate of Duke Ellington School for the Arts, and went on to study at the University of the District of Columbia.

Music career
His music career started in 1995, with the release of Broken by Intersound Records on June 1, 1995, and this album would go on to be his breakthrough release on the Billboard magazine charts, peaking at No. 1 on the Gospel Albums chart. His next release, Heart of a Love Song, was released by CGI Records in association with A&M Records on October 14, 1997, and this also charted on the Gospel Albums chart at No. 5. The next release with GGI Records was released on April 18, 2000, B2K: Prophetic Songs Of Promise, and again this charted on the Gospel Albums chart at No. 9. He released, Broken, Vol. 2: Live, with Tyscot Records on May 20, 2003, and this would chart on the Gospel Albums at No. 25.

Discography

References

External links
 Official website
 Cross Rhythms magazine article

1968 births
Living people
African-American songwriters
African-American Christians
Musicians from Washington, D.C.
Songwriters from Washington, D.C.
American male songwriters
21st-century African-American people
20th-century African-American people